Ashraf Amgad Elseify (born 20 February 1995) is a Qatari hammer thrower.

Biography
He won a gold medal at the 2012 Asian Junior Athletics Championships in Colombo, Sri Lanka, establishing a new Asian junior record and World Youth Best.

Elseify originally hails from Egypt and was talented spotted when he won the Egyptian youth title in Cairo as a 15-year-old. He was invited to train in Qatar, under the tutelage of Russian hammer coach Alexey Malyukov.

Achievements

References

External links

1995 births
Living people
Qatari male hammer throwers
Egyptian male hammer throwers
Egyptian emigrants to Qatar
Expatriate sportspeople in Qatar
World Athletics Championships athletes for Qatar
Athletes (track and field) at the 2016 Summer Olympics
Athletes (track and field) at the 2014 Asian Games
Athletes (track and field) at the 2018 Asian Games
Asian Games medalists in athletics (track and field)
Asian Games gold medalists for Qatar
Medalists at the 2018 Asian Games
Olympic athletes of Qatar
Qatari people of Egyptian descent
Asian Games gold medalists in athletics (track and field)
Islamic Solidarity Games medalists in athletics
Athletes (track and field) at the 2020 Summer Olympics